The California Interscholastic Federation—Central Section (CIF-CS) is the governing body of high school athletics in the central and southern portions of the San Joaquin Valley, the Eastern Sierra region, and as of the 2018/9 season, San Luis Obispo County and northern Santa Barbara County on the Central Coast. It is one of ten sections that comprise the California Interscholastic Federation (CIF). As of the 2020-21 academic year, the Central Section consists of 18 athletic leagues.

Leagues and schools

 Central Coast Athletic Association
 Central Sequoia League
 County Metro Athletic Conference
 East Sequoia League
 East Sierra League
 East Yosemite League
 Hi-Lo League
 High Desert League
 North Sequoia League
 North Yosemite League
 South Sequoia League
 South Yosemite League
 Southeast Yosemite League
 Southwest Yosemite League
 Tri-River Athletic Conference
 West Sequoia League
 West Sierra League
 West Yosemite League

References

External links
 

 
California Interscholastic Federation sections